Barbara Elaine Russell Brown (February 14, 1929 - January 7, 2019) was an American biologist and philanthropist.

Personal life 
Brown was born Barbara Russell, on 14 February 1929 in Chicago; her parents were Jewish immigrants from Romania and Russia. She graduated from the University of Illinois with a bachelor's degree in economics. In 1953, she married Roger Brown; they went on to have six children together. She moved to Highland Park, IL shortly after marrying, where the couple purchased five acres of undeveloped orchard, woodland, and marsh within the suburb, later adding five more acres to accommodate their children and dogs. Barbara enriched her community by joining the Highland Park Library Board, serving the city's Environmental Commission, as a guide at the Heller Nature Center, and by volunteering at elementary schools and extracurriculars. For decades, she was the president of the North Shore Bird Club, and was an avid birder through the United States, Canada, Australia and Central America.

Careers 
Brown's career began as an assistant to the zoologist Philip Hershkovitz. From 1974, she served the Women's Boards at the Chicago Field Museum of Natural History for 47 years, moving to the Chicago Botanic Garden in 2010. Her research at the Field Museum was concentrated on mammalogy, with an emphasis in New World species. Brown's research involved expeditions to the Cerrado savanna and to the Atlantic coastal forest of Brazil, and she authored an important treatise on marsupials. She was a skilled animal collector, with expertise in preparing specimens and setting traps.

Eponyms 

Brown has had 4 new species named after her. These include:

 Isothrix barbarabrownae - Barbara Brown's Brush-tailed Rat
 Callicebus barbarabrownae - Barbara Brown's titi
Apomys brownorum - Mount Tapulao forest mouse
Vadaravis brownae - a Threskiornithidae-like fossil bird

Philanthropy 
With her husband Roger Brown, she has philanthropically supported the Field Museum, the Science Museum of Minnesota, and the Chicago Botanic Garden. This endowment included the new post - the Barbara Brown Chair of Ornithology - who directs the Science Museum of Minnesota's new ornithology department.

References 

1929 births
2019 deaths
20th-century American Jews
American biologists
American people of Russian-Jewish descent
American people of Romanian-Jewish descent
20th-century American philanthropists
University of Illinois Urbana-Champaign alumni
American expatriates in Brazil
21st-century American Jews